The Crișul Băița  (also: Crișul Băiței) is a right tributary of the river Crișul Negru in Romania. It flows into the Crișul Negru in the town Ștei.

References

Rivers of Romania
Rivers of Bihor County